Phyllotodes obliquefasciatus is a species of beetle in the family Cerambycidae, and the only species in the genus Phyllotodes. It was described by Adlbauer in 2001.

References

Dorcasominae
Beetles described in 2001
Monotypic beetle genera